Ellis T. Johnson (August 8, 1910 – August 5, 1990) was an American football, basketball, baseball, and track and field player and coach. He was a four-sport letter-winner at the University of Kentucky, playing basketball, football, baseball, and track and field. In 1933 he became Adolph Rupp's first All-American at Kentucky.

Johnson was the head coach of Morehead State University men's basketball, football, baseball, and track. He is Morehead's all-time winningest coach in football, with a 54–44–10 mark, and in basketball, where his teams went 176–158. Johnson also served as men's basketball head coach at Marshall University.

Head coaching record

Football

Basketball

References

External links
 

1910 births
1990 deaths
All-American college men's basketball players
American men's basketball players
Baseball players from Kentucky
Basketball coaches from Kentucky
Basketball players from Kentucky
Kentucky Wildcats baseball players
Kentucky Wildcats football players
Kentucky Wildcats men's basketball players
Kentucky Wildcats men's track and field athletes
Marshall Thundering Herd men's basketball coaches
Morehead State Eagles athletic directors
Morehead State Eagles baseball coaches
Morehead State Eagles football coaches
Morehead State Eagles men's basketball coaches
Players of American football from Kentucky
Sportspeople from Ashland, Kentucky